Ifigeneia Giannopoulou (1964 – June 24, 2004) was a Greek songwriter. She also wrote books for children. Giannopoulou worked with great names of Greek music. She died suddenly as a result of suspected allergic reaction.

1964 births
2004 deaths
Greek songwriters